Barnsley Broncos is a rugby league team based in Barnsley, South Yorkshire, England. They play in the Yorkshire and Lincolnshire division of the Rugby League Conference.

History
Barnsley Rugby League was founded in 2009. Barnsley were based at Shaw Lane Sports Centre in a ground share with Barnsley rugby union club. Barnsley RL played the entire season in bright pink kits, in support of Yorkshire Cancer Research. In their first season, Barnsley finished 3rd in the RL Merit League and made the semi-finals of the play-offs, only narrowly losing to nearby Upton ARLFC. The team were also awarded host club of the year 2009.

The club joined the Yorkshire and Lincolnshire division of the Rugby League Conference in 2010 as Barnsley Broncos and finished mid-table.

The club moved to Dodworth Miners Welfare for the 2011 season.

The club folded in 2013 due to a lack of players to keep a competitive squad.

External links
Archive copy of official site (18 October 2012)

Rugby League Conference teams
Sport in Barnsley
Rugby clubs established in 2009
2009 establishments in England
Rugby league teams in South Yorkshire
English rugby league teams